Actinochloridaceae is a family of green algae, in the order Chlamydomonadales.

Genera
, AlgaeBase accepted four genera:
Actinochloris Korschikov – 1 species
Deasonia H.Ettl & J.Komárek – 6 species
Macrochloris Korshikov – 6 species
Pseudodictyochloris Vinatzer – 2 species

References

External links

Scientific references

Scientific databases
 AlgaTerra database
 Index Nominum Genericorum

Chlorophyceae families
Chlamydomonadales